= Semari Khurd, Huzur tehsil =

Semari Khurd
- village
- Location within Madhya Pradesh Location within India
- Coordinates: 23.1614064°N 77.5511944°E
- Country: India
- State: Madhya Pradesh
- District: Bhopal
- Tehsil: Huzur
- Elevation: 449 m (1,473 ft)

Population (2011)
  - Total: 309
- Time zone: UTC+5:30 (IST)
- ISO 3166 code: MP-IN
- 2011 census code: 482449

Semari Khurd is a village in the Bhopal district of Madhya Pradesh, India. It is located in the Huzur tehsil and the Phanda block.

== Demographics ==
According to the 2011 census of India, Semari Khurd has 54 households. The effective literacy rate (i.e. the literacy rate of population excluding children aged 6 and below) is 77.44%.

Demographics (2011 Census)
	Total	Male	Female
Population	309	158	151
Children aged below 6 years	43	22	21
Scheduled caste	56	28	28
Scheduled tribe	27	14	13
Literates	206	120	86
Workers (all)	93	77	16
Main workers (total)	93	77	16
Main workers: Cultivators	40	39	1
Main workers: Agricultural labourers	39	27	12
Main workers: Household industry workers	0	0	0
Main workers: Other	14	11	3
Marginal workers (total)	0	0	0
Marginal workers: Cultivators	0	0	0
Marginal workers: Agricultural labourers	0	0	0
Marginal workers: Household industry workers	0	0	0
Marginal workers: Others	0	0	0
Non-workers	216	81	135
